Dominik Stipsits (born 1 September 1994) is an Austrian badminton player. Stipsits was born in Korneuburg, and spent his childhood in Stammersdorf, Vienna. He started to playing badminton in 2002, and selected to join the national team in 2013. As a junior player, he competed at the 2012 BWF World Junior Championships and 2013 European Junior Badminton Championships. In 2017, he competed at the World Championships reach in to the second round. He won his first senior international title at the 2017 Bulgarian International tournament in the mixed doubles event partnered with Antonia Meinke.

Achievements

BWF International Challenge/Series 
Men's doubles

Mixed doubles

  BWF International Challenge tournament
  BWF International Series tournament
  BWF Future Series tournament

References

External links 
 

1994 births
Living people
People from Korneuburg
Sportspeople from Lower Austria
Austrian male badminton players
Badminton players at the 2019 European Games
European Games competitors for Austria
21st-century Austrian people